Muhammed Mustafa Baygül (born 3 June 1992) is a Turkish professional basketball player for Bahçeşehir Koleji of the Basketbol Süper Ligi (BSL) and Basketball Champions League. He is 1.91 m tall and plays at guard.

Professional career
On 29 July 2015 he signed with Pınar Karşıyaka of the Basketbol Süper Ligi.

On 5 July 2017 he signed with Darüşşafaka of the Basketbol Süper Ligi.

On 1 August 2019 he signed with Türk Telekom of the Basketbol Süper Ligi. He averaged 10.7 points and 2.9 assists per game during the 2019-20 season. On 21 June 2020 Türk Telekom re-signed Baygül.

On 10 July 2021 he signed with Bahçeşehir Koleji of the Turkish Basketbol Süper Ligi (BSL).

References

External links
TBLStat.net Profile

1992 births
Living people
Bahçeşehir Koleji S.K. players
Darüşşafaka Basketbol players
Galatasaray S.K. (men's basketball) players
Guards (basketball)
Hacettepe Üniversitesi B.K. players
Karşıyaka basketball players
TED Ankara Kolejliler players
Türk Telekom B.K. players